Mount Pleasant High School is a comprehensive public high school in Mount Pleasant, North Carolina, United States, in the Cabarrus County Schools system.  The school's current campus opened in 1992.

MPHS is the top school in Cabarrus County in Technology with a grant for all new computers in 2010.  There is at least 1 smartboard per department and most classrooms have NEC digital projectors in 2 of the science department, all of the CTE Class (Except Masonry & Auto Mechanics), 2 of the math classes, 3 in the Social Studies department.  MPHS has approximately 2 computer labs with about 30 DELL Optiplex Workstations.  There are 6 CTE classes with about 25 workstations including Digital Communications, Computer Applications 1 & 2, E-commence 1 & 2, Digital Media 1, Drafting 1, & Drafting 2.  Our library is also equipped with 25 workstations for student use and 3 newer workstations for card catalog searching.  MPHS also feature 6 C.O.W.S. (Computer on Wheels) which consists of a Dell workstation (some with StarBoards, or Mimios), a Digital Projector, and a cart.

MPHS also has 2 dedicated backup power generators which power computers and lights in the event of a power outage in both the main building and the Vocational building.

Athletics
Mount Pleasant's athletic teams are known as the Tigers.  The Tigers are in the 2A classification of the North Carolina High School Athletic Association (NCHSAA) and compete in the Yadkin Valley Conference. The school has sports teams in football, basketball, baseball, golf, cross country, track and field, tennis, swimming, volleyball, softball, wrestling, and soccer.

See also
Education in the United States

References

Schools in Cabarrus County, North Carolina
Public high schools in North Carolina